Baima is a town of Shizhong District, Leshan, Sichuan, People's Republic of China, situated about  to the northeast of downtown Leshan. , it has two residential communities and 15 villages under its administration:
Baimachang Community
Tongjiachang Community
Wanjing Village
Chejiashan Village
Jinghua Village
Baihe Village
Mochihe Village
Hongguang Village
Guangming Village
Kaihua Village
Shengxi Village
Hongqi Village
Fenghuang Village
Chaoyang Village
Lejia Village
Songbai Village
Liu Village

See also 
 List of township-level divisions of Sichuan

References 

Towns in Sichuan
Leshan